is a manga written by Yokusaru Shibata. It was serialized in Weekly Young Jump, published by Shueisha. It is aired as a drama series from May 3, 2008, starring Junpei Mizobata and Riisa Naka. The title refers to the main character's shogi nickname, which comes from the words of his former teacher who once told him to dive into the 9 by 9 (81) squares of the shogi board.

Plot
Kentarō failed at entering the professional league of shogi board game competition. However, he continues to play the game for a living by gambling at amateur shogi clubs. His encounter and defeat by the shogi player known as Akihabara's "Ukeshi" shocks him and, combined with his financial crisis, reinvigorates him to take shogi more seriously. He also finds out by chance that the Ukeshi offers a part-time maid cosplay house cleaning service, another side of her which further intrigues him.

Characters

Video games
None of the video games were released outside Japan.

References

External links
 
 Drama adaptation official webpage
 DS game adaptation official website
 

2006 manga
2008 Japanese television series debuts
2009 Japanese television series endings
2014 comics endings
Fuji TV dramas
Japanese television dramas based on manga
Live-action shows scored by Hiroyuki Sawano
Manga adapted into television series
Seinen manga
Shogi in anime and manga
Shueisha franchises
Shueisha manga